Jephson Busteed  was an Irish politician.

Busteed was born in County Cork and educated at Trinity College, Dublin. He was MP for Midleton from 1713 to 1714;  Rathcormack from 1715 to 1727; and  Doneraile from 1727 to 1728.

References

Alumni of Trinity College Dublin
People from County Cork
Irish MPs 1703–1713
Irish MPs 1713–1714
Irish MPs 1715–1727
Irish MPs 1727–1760
Members of the Parliament of Ireland (pre-1801) for County Cork constituencies